Novorossiysk Fuel Oil Terminal is an oil terminal located in Novorossiysk, Russia. It is jointly owned by Gunvor and Novorossiysk Commercial Sea Port. The terminal in Novorossiysk was commissioned in 2012.

Terminal 
Novorossiysk Fuel Oil Terminal is planned to accommodate tankers 40-47 thousand tons. However, due to the proximity of the grain terminal in court on oil and grain terminals will wind up consistently for security purposes. The new terminal will be located near the terminal for transshipment of diesel fuel, Jet Fuel, M100. Recall, OJSC Novorossiysk commercial sea port and oil trader Gunvor own 50% in LLC Novorossiysk fuel oil terminal".

References

External links

Company official website (English)

Novorossiysk
Oil terminals